Trần Thanh Vân (born 24 July 1959) is a Vietnamese sprinter. She competed in the women's 100 metres at the 1980 Summer Olympics.

References

External links
 

1959 births
Living people
Athletes (track and field) at the 1980 Summer Olympics
Vietnamese female sprinters
Olympic athletes of Vietnam
Place of birth missing (living people)
Olympic female sprinters
21st-century Vietnamese women